The Killing Moon is a fantasy novel by N. K. Jemisin, and the first novel in the Dreamblood series, followed by The Shadowed Sun. Released on May 1, 2012 by Orbit Books, The Killing Moon centers on a series of murders and a potential magic war.

Synopsis
The book follows Ehiru, a Gatherer who has sworn to help keep the peace in the city of Gujaareh. It is they who must gather together magic while people sleep, using the magic for altruistic purposes as well as to protect the city from the corrupt. However, when dreamers begin dying, the murders seemingly done in the name of the city's dream-goddess, Ehiru must find out who is doing this and why before the city is destroyed in the process.

Reception
Reviews for the book were predominantly positive. Slant Magazine praised The Killing Moon, calling N.K. Jemisin a "rising talent with a career worth following." io9 praised the book's themes of "religion, gods and magic." Kirkus Reviews wrote that the book was "fulfilling" but remarked that at points the book was "claustrophobic" and that it lacked maps.

The book was nominated for a Nebula Award and a World Fantasy Award in 2013.

References

External links
Official author website

2012 American novels
Novels by N. K. Jemisin
Orbit Books books